Šikić, Sikic is a Croatian surname. Notable people with the surname include: 

Josip Šikić (born 1929), Croatian footballer
Nada Šikić (born 1955), Croatian politician
Tena Šikić (born 1994), Croatian judoka
Branimir Ivan Sikic, American doctor and scientist

Croatian surnames